Ministry of Intelligence may refer to:

Ministry of Intelligence (Iran)
Ministry of Intelligence (Israel)